The Hela are a community found in the state of Rajasthan in India. They are Muslim converts from the Hindu Hela caste.

Origin

The Hela are a community of musicians. They claim to have come from Arabia, sometime in the distant past. The Hela are found in the districts of udaipur Bundi, Kota, Tonk and Jhalawar. They speak the Hadoti dialect of Hindi. The Hela are strictly endogamous, and marry close kin.

Present
Hela communities exist in Udaipur, Ujjain, Bundi, Dhar, and Susner. They are a landless community, and many are employed as wage labourers. Many are now employed in government sector. Traditional occupations are musicians, instrumentalists, singers and other musical trades. The Hela are well versed in ragas such as dadra and thumri, but practice many folk beliefs.

See also
 Halalkhor

References

Dalit Muslim
Social groups of Rajasthan
Muslim communities of India
Muslim communities of Rajasthan